"Nothing in This World" is a 2006 song by Paris Hilton.

Nothing in This World may also refer to:

 "Nothing in This World" (Keke Wyatt song), 2001
 "Nothing in This World" (Taxiride song), 2000
 "Nothin' in This World", a 2016 song by Idina Menzel from Idina